Tacon is a surname. Notable people with the surname include:

Avelin P. Tacon Jr. (1914–2014), American Air Force major general
Carlos Fernando Martínez de Irujo y Tacón (1763–1824), Spanish Prime Minister and diplomat,
Christine Tacon (born 1959), British government administrator
Edna Taçon (1905–1980), Canadian painter
Ferran Tacón (born 1986), Spanish footballer
Joy Tacon (born 1961), British tennis player
Paul Taçon (born 1958), Australian anthropologist and archaeologist

See also 
Paseo de Tacón, promenade in Havana, Cuba
Tacón Theatre, was a theatre in Havana, Cuba